Eugenia valvata is a species of plant in the family Myrtaceae. It is endemic to Ecuador.

References

Endemic flora of Ecuador
valvata
Near threatened plants
Taxonomy articles created by Polbot